This is a list of Latin American television stations.

Pay television channels

A&E Latin America
Animal Planet Latin America
AXN
Boomerang
Cinecanal
Cartoon Network
Comedy Central
Discovery Civilization
Discovery Kids
Discovery Science Channel
Discovery Turbo
Disney Channel
Disney Junior
Disney XD
Enlace TBN
ESPN
ESPN 2
ESPN 3
Eurochannel
Fox Sports 
Fox Sports 2 
Fox Sports 3 
EWTN Latin America
FXM
HBO
History
I.Sat
TNT Series
ManagemenTV
MTV Latin America
MuchMusic
Nat Geo Kids
National Geographic Channel Latin America
Nickelodeon Latin America
Nick Jr.
Investigation Discovery
TruTV
Canal Sony
Space
Star Channel
Star Premium
Telehit
Telesur
Universal TV
Warner Channel

Caribbean

Cuba

Dominican Republic

HIN-TVAntena Latina
Canal 25 
CDN Cadena de noticias 
HISD-TVCERTV 
HIMQ-TVColor Visión 
Microvision Canal 10 
RNN
HIJB-TVTele Antillas
HITM-TVTelemicro 
HITD-TVTelesistema

Guadeloupe
Note: All transmissions in Guadeloupe are in digital terrestrial television.

Local channels 
 Channel 1, Guadeloupe La Première
 Channel 3, Canal 10
 Channel 4, France 2
 Channel 5, France 3
 Channel 6, France 4
 Channel 7, France 5
 Channel 9, ARTE
 Channel 10, franceinfo:
 Channel 11, Éclair Télévision (ETV)
 Channel 12, Alizés Guadeloupe

Cable TV 
On cable TV (SFR Caraïbe), the local channels are:

 Alizés Guadeloupe
 Canal 10
 Éclair Télévision
 Guadeloupe La 1ère

Haiti
 Haiti TV

Port-au-Prince 
 Canal 4 Télé Eclair
 Canal 5 Télémax
 Canal 6 Radio Tele 6 Univers – Les Cayes, Sud (website)
 Canal 8 TNH (Télévision Nationale d'Haiti)
 Canal 11 Canal 11
 Canal 13 Télé Timoun/
 Canal 16 Télé Shalom
 Canal 18 Radio Télé Ginen
 Canal 20 Tele Podium
 Canal 22 Tele Caraïbes
 Canal 24 Tele Lumiere
 Canal 28 Kanal Kreyol
 Canal 30 Tele Variete Haiti
 Canal 32 Tele Pa Nou
 Canal 34 Tele 34
 Canal 36 Tele Antillaise
 Canal 38 Canal Bleu
 Canal 40 Tele Star
 Canal 42 Tele Antilles
 Canal 44 Tele Pluriel
 Canal 46 Tele Maxima
 Canal 50 TV Numerique Multicanal
 Canal 52 Tele Metropole

Other areas in Haiti 
 Canal 4 TNH
 Canal 4 Télé Caramel – Les Cayes, Sud
 Canal 6 TV Nord'Ouest
 Canal 6 Radio Tele 6 Univers – Les Cayes, Sud (website)
 Canal 7 Tele 7 Cap-Haïtien
 Canal 7  Tele Yaguana - Leogane
 Canal 9 Tele Cap-Haïtien
 Canal 9 Tele Provinciale 9/TNH, Gonaïves
 Canal 10 Tele Nami- Les Cayes, Sud
 Canal 11 Tele RTGS – Les Cayes, Sud
 Canal 10 Tele Maxima
 Canal 11 Ambiance TV 11, Jacmel
 Canal 12 TV de la Metropole du Sud, Cayes
 Canal 16  Television Hirondelle, Cayes
 Canal 12 TNH, Cap-Haïtien
 Canal 15 Saint-Marc
 Canal 28 Tele La Brise, Camp-Perrin
 Canal 65 RTC 65, Saint-Marc

Martinique
Note: All transmissions in Martinique are in digital terrestrial television.

Local channels 
 Channel 1, Martinique La Première
 Channel 2, viàATV (Some of TF1 and M6 programmes)
 Channel 3, Kanal Matinik Television (KMT)
 Channel 4, France 2
 Channel 5, France 3
 Channel 6, France 4
 Channel 7, France 5
 Channel 9, ARTE
 Channel 10, franceinfo:
 Channel 11, Zitata TV

Cable TV 
On cable TV (SFR Caraïbe), the local channels are:

 Annonces TV
 APTV (live internet)
 Graphé TV
 KMT
 LCC
 Martinique La 1ère
 TV Famille
 viàATV
 Zouk TV

Puerto Rico

Saint Barthélemy
Note: All transmissions in Saint Barthélemy are in digital terrestrial television.

Local channels 
 Channel 1, Guadeloupe La Première
 Channel 3, France 2
 Channel 4, France 3
 Channel 5, France 4
 Channel 6, France 5
 Channel 8, ARTE
 Channel 9, franceinfo:

Saint Martin
 Guadeloupe La Première
 MSR Cable
 TELTV+
 TVCARiB on WTN

Central America

Belize
Great Belize Television
Tropical Vision Limited
Krem Television
LOVE Belize

Costa Rica

 Template:San Jose TV
 TITNS-TV: CDR Canal 2
 TIIVS-TV: Repretel 4
 TITV-TV:  Repretel 6
 TITSR-TV: Teletica Canal 7
 TIDE-TV:  Canal 9 teve
 TITEC-TV: Sinart 10 (TISRN-TV translator)
 TIBYK-TV: Repretel 11
 TISRN-TV: Sinart Canal 13
 TI------: TV Sur Canal 14 (Zona Sur)
 TIUCR-TV: UCR Canal 15
 TI------: Canal 29 VM Latino
 TI------:  Teletica Canal 33
 TI------: Anexion TV Canal 36 (Guanacaste y Limón)
 TI------: Extra TV Canal 42
 TI------: Telecable Canal 12 (Cable)

El Salvador

 YSR-TV 2: Canal Dos - Telecorporacion Salvadoreña
 YSU-TV 4: Canal Cuatro - Telecorporacion Salvadoreña
 YSLA-TV 6: Canal Seis - Telecorporacion Salvadoreña
 YSWE-TV 8: Canal Ocho - Agape TV
 YSAL-TV 9: Canal Nueve - Legislative Assembly Channel
 YSWD-TV 10: Canal Diez - Televisión de El Salvador
 YSTU-TV 11: Canal Once - Red Salvadoreña de Medios
 YSWX-TV 12: Canal Doce - Red Salvadoreña de Medios
 YSJR-TV 15: Canal Quince - Grupo Megavision (Movie World)
 YSXL-TV 17: Canal Diecisiete - Independent/Youth Music Videos
 YSXW-TV 19: Canal Diecinueve - Grupo Megavision (News Channel)
 YSXO-TV 21: Canal Veintiuno - Grupo Megavision
 YSXY-TV 23: Canal Veintitrés - TVX (El Salvador) (Independent)
 YSZX-TV 25: Canal Veinticinco - Órbita TV (TBN)
 YSWV-TV 27: Canal Veintisiete (religious)
 YSTP-TV 33: Canal Treinta y Tres - Francisco Gavidia University
 YSUT-TV 35: Canal Treinta y Cinco - Telecorporacion Salvadoreña
 YSNA-TV 57: Canal Católico (religious)
 YSMH-TV 65: El Canal de Jesus Cristo (CJC 65)
 YSAE-TV 67: TCI

Guatemala

 TGV-TV: 3 (Guatemala City)| 10: Canal 3 - El Súper Canal (Televisión Guatemalteca - Albavisión)
 TGCE-TV: 5 (Guatemala City) | 12: TV Maya (Academy of Mayan Languages of Guatemala); formerly known as Cultural and Educational TV (military channel)
 TGVG-TV: 7 (Guatemala City)| 8: Televisiete (Televisión Guatemalteca - Albavisión)
 TGW-TV: 8 (Guatemala): Televisión Nacional (first television channel in the country, already disappeared) (Channel State)
 TGCC-TV: 9 (Guatemala City)| 4: Congress Channel -Outside Air-
 TGMO-TV: 11 (Guatemala City)| 6: TeleOnce (Televisión Guatemalteca - state-operated)
 TGSS-TV: 13 (Guatemala City)| 2: Trecevisión (Televisión Guatemalteca -  state-operated)
 Canal 19 (Guatemala City): Sonora TV  (Radio Sonora - Albavisión)
 Canal 21 (Guatemala City): Enlace-TBN
 Canal 22 (San Marcos)
 Canal 22 (Escuintla) TV Azteca Guatemala
 Canal 23 (Guatemala City): Todonoticias (Albavisión)
 canal 25 (Guatemala City): Guatevision "Un canal como debe ser"
 Canal 27 (Guatemala City)| 28 and 66: El Canal de la Esperanza (Christian Ministry Grounds)
 Canal 29 (Guatemala City): Grupo Nuevo Mundo 
 Canal 31 (Guatemala City): TV Azteca; formerly known as Latitud Televisión
 Canal 33 (Guatemala City): TV-USAC
 Canal 35 (Guatemala City): TV Azteca
 Canal 40 (Petén): Corporación de Radio y Televisión Petenera, S. A.
 Canal 41 (Guatemala City): International Channel Telecentro
 Canal 43 (Guatemala City): International Channel Telecentro
 Canal 45 (Guatemala City): Jesus TV (Catholic channel)
 Canal 58 (Suchitepequez) : Mazatevision 
 Canal 61 (Guatemala City): Enlace Juvenil
 Canal 63 (Guatemala City): Channel Archdiocese of Guatemala
 Canal 65 (Guatemala City): Family TV; formerly known as EWTN and TV Light (Catholic channel) -Outside Air-

Cable or satellite channels 

 Canal de Gobierno (television Gubernamental Organismo Ejecutivo)
 Guatevision "Un canal como debe ser"
 Canal Antigua: "Mira sin límites"
 NTV (Nacional Tele Vision): "Lo que nadie se atreve a mostrar"
 18-50 Televisión: "Diferente"
 VEA Canal:"Vida, Ecología y Ambiente"
  TV : "Un canal con actitud"
 Región + (Quetzaltenango)
 Huehuevision: "El Canal de los Huehuetecos"

Honduras

 HRJS-TV 2: Vica Television
 HRXN-TV 2: Tele Ceiba
 HRCV-TV 3/7: Telesistema 3/7 - 
 HRLP-TV 4/7: Telecadena
 HRTG-TV 5: Canal5 - El Lider
 HRJG-TV 6: Canal 6
 Canal 8 Honduras
 HRTS-TV 7:
 HRJS-TV 9: Vica Television
 HRNQ-TV 13: Cruceña de TV
 Canal 11
 Canal 48 - El Canal de la Solidaridad
 JBN
 Maya TV
 Pueblovision Canal 36
 SOTEL Canal 11
 TEN

Nicaragua

 Template:Nicaragua TV
 YNTC-TV 2: Televicentro Canal 2
 YNTM-TV 4: Canal 4
 YNSA-TV 6: Canal 6
 YN??-TV 8: Telenica Canal 8
 YNSA-TV 9: Canal 9 
 YN??-TV 10: Canal 10
 YN??-TV 11: TV RED
 YNLG-TV 12: Canal 12 Nicavisión
 YNSA-TV 13: Viva Nicaragua 13
 YN??-TV 14: Vos TV
 YN??-TV 17: Magic Channel
 YN??-TV 21: Enlace Nicaragua
 YN??-TV 23: CDNN 23
 YN??-TV 35: Telenorte Canal 35
 Canal 15 (100% Noticias)
 Atv98
 SSTV (defunct; 1979–1990)
 SNTV (defunct; 1990–1997)

Panama

 Template:Panama TV
 RPC TV Canal 4
 TVN Canal 2
 Telemetro Canal 13
 FETV Canal 5
 ETV Canal 6
 SERTV Canal 11
 TVMax Canal 9
 NexTV Canal 21
 Mall TV Canal 7
 +23 Canal 23 (Panama's first music station)
 Enlace Canal 29
 NexTV Canal 33 (temp. mirroring signal from +23)
 Plus Canal 35
 Hosana Visión Canal 37
 ACP (Canal TV) Canal 25 (water level radar)

Defunct stations 

 Panavision Canal 5
 Telecinco Canal 5
 SCN Channel 8
 Tele7 Canal 7
 Grupo Mix Holding: RCM Canal 21, Mix TV Canal 33
 Riande Productions: TVO Canal 21, ShopTv Canal 33
 Cadena Millenium: RCM Canal 21, RCM Mundo Canal 33, RCM Plus Canal 35
 QEXTV La Exitosa Canal 27 (signal test)

Mexico

Television stations in Aguascalientes
Television stations in Baja California
Television stations in Baja California Sur
Television stations in Campeche
Television stations in Chiapas
Television stations in Chihuahua
Television stations in Coahuila
Television stations in Colima
Television stations in Distrito Federal
Television stations in Durango
Television stations in Guanajuato
Television stations in Guerrero
Television stations in Hidalgo
Television stations in Jalisco
Television stations in the State of Mexico
Television stations in Michoacán
Television stations in Morelos
Television stations in Nayarit
Television stations in Nuevo León
Television stations in Oaxaca
Television stations in Puebla
Television stations in Querétaro
Television stations in Quintana Roo
Television stations in San Luis Potosí
Television stations in Sinaloa
Television stations in Sonora
Television stations in Tabasco
Television stations in Tamaulipas
Television stations in Tlaxcala
Television stations in Veracruz
Television stations in Yucatán
Television stations in Zacatecas

South America

Argentina

Alef Network
América 2 (Canal 2)
América 24
America Satelital 
America Sports (PRAMER) 
Argentinisima Satelital
C5N
Cable Sport (Gala Producciones)
Canal (á)
Canal 11 Salta
Canal 12 Cordoba
Canal 12 Posadas
ARTEAR (Arte Radiotelevisivo Argentino- Canal 13)
Canal 26
Canal 3 La Pampa (LU89)
Canal 6 TV Alternativa
Canal 7 (formerly known as ATC - Argentina Televisora Color)
Canal 7 Santiago del Estero
Canal 8 Mar del Plata
Canal 9
Canal del Turista
Canal Luz Satelital
Canal Rural Satelital
CM (El canal de la música)
Conexión 31
Conexión Educativa
Crónica TV
CVN
El Bar TV
El Garage TV
ElGourmet.com TV
Europa Europa (Pramer)
Film & Arts
Formar TV
Fox Life Latin America
GChannel
Infinito TV
I.Sat
Magazine 24
Magic Kids
ManagemenTV
MuchaMusica
Multideporte
Music21
National Geographic Channel Latino
P&E (Política y Economía)
Plus Satelital
Red Educativa del Litoral
Red Media Educativa
Retro TV
Rio de la Plata TV
Rock & Pop TV
Sembrando Satelital
Siempre Mujer
Solo Tango
SPACE
Superland
SuperShow
Telefe
Telefe International
TeleMall
Telemúsica
TN (Todo Noticias)
Tropicalisima Satelital
TV5 Monde Amérique Latine
TVI Satelital (Televisión Interactiva Satélital)
TyC Max (Torneos y Competencias)
TyC Sports (Torneos y Competencias)
TyC Sports Internacional
Utilisima Satelital
Venus
Volver

Bolivia

Bolivisión (Canal 4)
Corazon Albiverde, subscription based sports satellite and cable channel
Red ATB
Red Uno de Bolivia
Televisión Boliviana
Televisión Católica
Unitel Bolivia

Brazil

Chile

Colombia

Body Channel
Canaan TV
Canal 13 (formerly known as TV Andina)
Canal Capital
Canal Congreso
Cosmovision
Canal Institucional
Canal TRO
Canal Uno
Caracol TV
Caracol TV Internacional
Novelas Caracol
Cinema+
City TV Colombia
CMB TV
CNC (Canal NotiColombia)
Cristovisión
Guasca TV
Humor Channel
Canal RCN (Radio Cadena Nacional)
RCN Nuestra Tele Internacional
Nuestra Tele Noticias 24 Horas
RCN Novelas
Señal Colombia
Series & Series TV
TV Prensa
Teleamiga
Teleantioquia
Telecafé
Telecaribe
Telepacífico
Tele VID

Ecuador

Canal 1 Ecuador
Canal 1 Internacional
Ecuavisa
Ecuavisa Internacional
Gamavision
TC Television
Teleamazonas
Telecuador
Telesistema
Unsion TV

French Guiana
 Guyane La Première

Islas Malvinas (Falkland Islands)

 British Forces Broadcasting Service (BFBS)
 Falkland Islands Television Service
 KTV Ltd.

Paraguay

Red Guaraní (Canal 2) 
Telefuturo (Canal 4) 
Paravisión (Canal 5)
SNT (Canal 9) 
Red Paraguaya de Comunicaciones (Canal 13)
Paraguay TV (Canal 14)
Unicanal
Tigo Sports

Peru

América Televisión (Canal 4) 
ATV (Canal 9) 
ATV Sur
Bethel TV
USMP TV
Canal N

Congreso TV
Latina Televisión
Huascarán TV
Viva TV
Panamericana Televisión
Movistar Plus
América Next
TV Perú
La Tele (Peru)

Uruguay

Canal Once 
Canal TV10 Rivera 
Canal 4 
Paysandu TV 
Prisma TV 
Saeta TV (Canal 10) 
Senal Regional Rocha (Canal 8) 
Teveo (Canal 5) 
Teledoce (Canal 12) 
Teve CIUDAD 
TV Libre 
Uno TV 
VHP Televisión 
VTV Uruguaya

Venezuela

See also

 Lists of television stations in North America

Latin America
Television
Communications in El Salvador

Communications in Honduras
Communications in Nicaragua
Communications in Panama